John Henry Curran was an Irish professional baseball player who appeared in three games for the Philadelphia Athletics in . He was long listed as "Peter Curren" but SABR researchers discovered his true identity in 2009.

External links

1852 births
1896 deaths
Major League Baseball catchers
Philadelphia Athletics (NL) players
19th-century baseball players
Major League Baseball players from Ireland
Irish baseball players
Burials at Holy Cross Cemetery (Colma, California)
Brooklyn Chelsea players
Springfield (minor league baseball) players
Manchester (minor league baseball) players
San Francisco Athletics players
San Francisco (minor league baseball) players
Irish emigrants to the United States (before 1923)